HMS L1 was the lead boat of the L-class submarines built for the Royal Navy during World War I.

Design and description
The L-class boats were enlarged and improved versions of the preceding E class. They displaced  on the surface and  submerged. The L-class submarines had a crew of 35 officers and ratings.

For surface running, the boats were powered by two 12-cylinder Vickers  diesel engines, each driving one propeller shaft. When submerged each propeller was driven by a  electric motor. They could reach  on the surface and  underwater.

The boats were armed with a total of six  torpedo tubes. Four of these were in the bow and the remaining pair in broadside mounts. They carried 10 reload torpedoes, all for the bow tubes. L1 was initially fitted with a  anti-aircraft gun, but this was later replaced by a  deck gun.

Construction and career
Originally laid down by Vickers, Barrow, as E-class submarine E57 on 18 May 1916, she and sister ship  incorporated enough changes that they were renamed as the first pair of boats of a newly designated L class. L1 was launched 10 May 1917, and commissioned on 10 November 1917.

She sailed with the Submarine Depot Ship HMS Ambrose (1903) to Hong Kong in 1919 as part of the 4th Submarine Flotilla, arriving there in January 1920. L1 was placed in the reserve flotilla in 1923 in Hong Kong. She was then sold to John Cashmore Ltd in March 1930 for scrapping. While being towed to Newport she broke free and was stranded at Penanwell Cove, near Porth Nanven in Cornwall. She was scrapped where she lay. Some metal remains can still be seen there on low spring tides.

Notes

References
 
 
 
 

 

British E-class submarines of the Royal Navy
British L-class submarines
Ships built in Barrow-in-Furness
1917 ships
World War I submarines of the United Kingdom
Royal Navy ship names
Maritime incidents in 1930
Cornish shipwrecks